Dillwynia brunioides, commonly known as sandstone parrot-pea, is a species of flowering plant in the family Fabaceae and is endemic to New South Wales. It is an erect shrub with silky-hairy stems, linear, grooved leaves and yellow flowers with red markings.

Description

Taxonomy and naming
Dillwynia brunioides was first formally described in 1844 by Carl Meissner in Lehmann's Plantae Preissianae.

Distribution
This dillwynia grows in forest and heath on sandstone on the coast and ranges between the Blue Mountains, the Budawangs and Jervis Bay in eastern New South Wales.

References

brunioides
Flora of New South Wales
Taxa named by Carl Meissner
Plants described in 1844